The Men's 100 meter running deer, single and double shot event was a shooting sports event held as part of the Shooting at the 1952 Summer Olympics programme. It was the first appearance of the event. The competition was held on 28 and 29 July 1952 at the shooting ranges in Helsinki. 14 shooters from 7 nations competed.

Medalists

Results

References

Shooting at the 1952 Summer Olympics
100 meter running deer at the Olympics